Maryhill Football Club are an association football team based in the Maryhill area of Glasgow, Scotland. The team is a member of the Scottish Junior Football Association, now playing in the West of Scotland Football League Second Division  in the 2022-23 season.

History
Formed in 1884 as a Junior club, Maryhill were beaten finalists in the second-ever Scottish Junior Cup in 1887–88 and turned senior the following season. The club entered the Scottish Cup three years running from 1888 but never got further than the second round, suffering 9–3 and 7–2 defeats to Third Lanark and Linthouse respectively in 1889 and 1890. Maryhill eventually returned to the Junior ranks in 1894 with some success, reaching four national cup finals in eight years. The Hill also won a wartime final in 1940.

Post-war they were not one of the bigger Junior clubs, but investment from a wealthy backer, Ronnie MacDonald, in the 1990s brought a period of success. 
Currently the president of the club is Tam Drew.
The team plays at Lochburn Park, and has done since 1897. Club colours are red and black. 

The club received national news attention in April 2017 when Gavin Stokes scored the fastest goal on record in world football history in a home game against Clydebank, with his advance to the top corner from the midline timed at 2.1 seconds

In June 2019 it was announced that ICW (Insane Championship Wrestling) was to sponsor the club.

Mark Young was appointed the club's new manager on 26th May 2022, replacing Ross Wilson who departed for Bonnyton Thistle.

Current Squad

Coaching staff

League History (2011-Present)

Famous players 

  Jimmy Speirs, played one season at Maryhill, before joining Rangers and representing Scotland.
  Tommy Burns, former Celtic and Scotland player began his playing career at Maryhill.
  Jim Casey, former Celtic player and Scotland under-21 international.
  Jim Duffy, former player for, and later manager of, Morton and also manager of Dundee, among others. 1984–85 Scottish PFA Players' Player of the Year.
  Alex Harley, Scottish Football League top scorer in 1960–61 with 42 goals for Third Lanark.
  Pat McCluskey, former Celtic player with six Scottish under-23 caps.
  Danny McGrain, won 62 caps for Scotland and made 439 league appearances for Celtic between 1970 and 1987.
  Davie Meiklejohn, former Rangers captain and Scotland international.
  Paul Wilson, former Celtic and Scotland player.

Honours

Scottish Junior Cup
 Winners: 1899–1900, 1939–40
 Runners-up: 1887–88, 1900–01, 1901–02, 1906–07

Other Honours
 West of Scotland Cup winners: 2000–01, 2003–04
 Central League Premier Division champions: 1996–97, 1997–98
 Glasgow Junior League champions: 1900–01, 1903–04, 1904–05
 West Central Division Two champions: 2012–13

References

External links

 Squad photographs (1905), (1935) at Old Photographs Of Glasgow

Football clubs in Scotland
Scottish Junior Football Association clubs
Football clubs in Glasgow
Association football clubs established in 1884
1884 establishments in Scotland
Maryhill
West of Scotland Football League teams